Gujarat, a western state of India, is known for  music traditions of both folk and classical music.

Folk music
Gujarati folk music consists of a wide variety.  Marila dhol de bagar maro ichh led de, a devotional song type poetry are categorized by theme of poetry/lyrics and by musical compositions such as Prabhati, Katari, Dhol etc.  The Barot, Charan and Gadhvi communities has preserved and enriched the folk tradition of story telling with or without music. This includes the forms of Doha, Sorathaa, Chhand, etc.

The songs and music accompanying traditional dance forms such as Garba, Dandiya Raas, Padhar, Dangi and Tippani are unique in nature.

Dayro and Lokvarta are music performances where people gather to listen performer who delivers religious as well as social message through it. Marasiyas are elegiac form of music originated from Marsiya. Fattanna or Lagna-geets are light form of song and music played during marriages.

Bhavai and Akhyana are folk musical theatre performed in Gujarat.

Exponents
Classical musicians and composers include Faiyaz Khan and Pandit Omkarnath Thakur along with a tradition of Haveli Sangeet.

References

External links
 Gujarati Folk Videos
 Music in Gujarat on Discover India

Gujarat
Gujarati culture